The Tony Award for Best Director was one of the original 11 awards given in 1947 when the Tony Awards originated.  The award was presented until 1960 when it was split into two categories: Tony Award for Best Direction of a Play and Tony Award for Best Direction of a Musical.

Winners and nominees

1940s

1950s

Award records

Multiple wins
 3 Wins
 Elia Kazan
 Joshua Logan

Multiple nominations
 5 Nominations
 Elia Kazan

 3 Nominations
 Joshua Logan

 2 Nominations
 Joseph Anthony
 Harold Clurman
 Peter Glenville
 Tyrone Guthrie

See also
 Tony Award for Best Direction of a Musical
 Tony Award for Best Direction of a Play
 Drama Desk Award for Outstanding Director of a Musical
 Drama Desk Award for Outstanding Director of a Play
 Laurence Olivier Award for Best Director

References

External links
 Tony Awards Official site
 Tony Awards at Internet Broadway database Listing
 Tony Awards at broadwayworld.com

Tony Awards
Awards established in 1947
1947 establishments in the United States
1960 disestablishments in the United States